The women's 5000 metres at the 2013 World Championships in Athletics was held at the Luzhniki Stadium on 14–17 August.

With Margaret Wangari Muriuki dropping out injured in the first round, the finals had three Ethiopians (four if you count Tejitu Daba) and three Americans and only two Kenyans.  Also missing by design is world record holder Tirunesh Dibaba who won the 10000 earlier, leaving Meseret Defar the 5000.

The final started slow with the Ethiopians watching the front (the reigning Olympic champion Defar watching her teammates from the back), letting Dominika Nowakowska then Dolores Checa jog through 75-second laps at the front.  With 2000 to go, the racing began, Almaz Ayana took over the lead and the crowd disappeared.  Within a lap, not surprisingly, the three Ethiopians and two Kenyans were running alone.  Lap times were dropping, 71, 69, 68.  In the next lap Buze Diriba fell back to the trailing American duo of Molly Huddle and Shannon Rowbury.  The two Ethiopians were leading, the two Kenyans trying to keep up.  Shortly after the bell, Viola Kibiwot lost touch with her teammate Mercy Cherono and then there were three.  Defar stayed tucked into second place waiting until the time was right.  The time was 200 meters to go, that was when Defar accelerated past Ayana and into the lead.  Cherono made no effort to go after Defar, she was gone sprinting to gold.  Cherono waited through the turn and executed her best move to outsprint Ayana for the silver.  So prepared for victory, Defar and Ayana had already received their flags and were displaying them while the early leaders were still finishing.

Records
Prior to the competition, the records were as follows:

Qualification standards

Schedule

Results

Heats
Qualification: First 5 in each heat (Q) and the next 5 fastest (q) advanced to the final.

Final
The final was started at 18:55.

References

External links
5000 metres results at IAAF website

5000 metres
5000 metres at the World Athletics Championships
2013 in women's athletics